Frank Joseph Corridon [Fiddler] (November 25, 1880 – February 21, 1941) was a pitcher in Major League Baseball who played for three teams between the  and  seasons. Listed at  170 lb., Corridon was a switch-hitter and threw right-handed. He was born in Newport, Rhode Island.
 
Corridon entered the majors in 1904 with the Chicago Cubs, appearing for them in 24 games before joining the Philadelphia Phillies (1904–1905, 1907–1909) and St. Louis Cardinals (1910). His most productive season came with the 1907 Phillies, when he posted career-numbers in wins (18), starts (32), complete games (23) and innings pitched (274.0), while collecting a 2.46 ERA. He finished 14–10 with a 2.51 ERA the next season, and went 11–7 with a career-high 2.11 in 1909. He faded to 6–14 with the Cardinals in 1910, his last major league season.

In a six-year career, Corridon posted a 70–67 record with a 2.80 ERA in 180 appearances, including 140 starts, 99 complete games, 10 shutouts, seven saves and 1216.0 innings of work, posting a 1.22 strikeout-to-walk ratio (458-to-375).

Corridon died at the age of 60 in Syracuse, New York.

External links

Frank Corridon - Baseballbiography.com

Chicago Cubs players
Philadelphia Phillies players
St. Louis Cardinals players
Major League Baseball pitchers
Baseball players from Rhode Island
1880 births
1941 deaths
Minor league baseball managers
Pawtucket Colts players
Newport Colts players
Providence Clamdiggers (baseball) players
Providence Grays (minor league) players
Norwich Witches players
Williamsport Millionaires players
Buffalo Bisons (minor league) players
Springfield Ponies players
Sportspeople from Newport, Rhode Island